Pristimantis curtipes is a species of frog in the family Strabomantidae. It is found in the Nariño Department of southern Colombia and in the Andes of Ecuador south to Desierto de Palmira (Chimborazo Province).

Description
Pristimantis curtipes is a short-legged frog that shows large variation in adult size and colouration. Males measure  and females  in snout–vent length. Head is narrower than the body and wider than long. Tympanum is concealed. Dorsum bears low, flat warts and a pair of ill-defined dorsolateral folds. The colouration is highly variable but the ground color is usually dark gray or brown. Most specimens have indefinite darker mottling on the dorsum, striped in some individuals.

Habitat
Pristimantis curtipes is a widely distributed and relatively common species. Its altitudinal range is  asl, probably extending higher. It is found primarily in páramo habitats and, at lower end of its altitudinal range, in montane forests. When inactive, these frogs shelter under rocks on very humid grounds. The altitudinal range overlaps with Pristimantis unistrigatus; in similar habitats at lower altitudes Pristimantis curtipes is replaced by the latter.

Conservation
Pristimantis curtipes is an adaptable species that is under no significant threat, although habitat loss remains a potential threat. It is present in a number of national parks and reserves in Ecuador, including the Cotopaxi and Llanganates National Parks.

References

curtipes
Amphibians of the Andes
Amphibians of Colombia
Amphibians of Ecuador
Páramo fauna
Amphibians described in 1882
Taxonomy articles created by Polbot